Doudart de Lagrée (F728) is a  in the French Navy.

Development and design 

Designed to navigate overseas, the escort escorts were fully air-conditioned, resulting in appreciated comfort, which was far from being the case for other contemporary naval vessels.

A posting on a Aviso-escort was a boarding sought after by sailors because it was a guarantee of campaigning overseas and visiting the country.

Four other similar units were built at Ateliers et Chantiers de Bretagne (ACB) in Nantes for the Portuguese Navy under the class name João Belo.

All French units were decommissioned in the mid-1990s. Three ships were sold to the Uruguayan Navy.

In 1984, Commandant Rivière underwent a redesign to become an experimentation building. It will retain only a single triple platform of 550mm anti-submarine torpedo tubes and all the rest of the armament was landed, replaced by a single 40mm anti-aircraft gun and two 12.7mm machine guns.

Construction and career 
Doudart de Lagrée was laid down in March 1960 at Arsenal de Lorient, Lorient. Launched on 15 April 1961 and commissioned on 1 May 1963.

From 1981 to 1983, as a preserve of Joan of Arc, she carried out 22 patrols in the Persian Gulf.

In 1986, she evacuated our nationals to Aden then it will be the Gulf War and a port base in Djibouti.

She was decommissioned in 1992, her number was changed to Q686 and serve as a breakwater in Brest from 1994 to 1999.

Sunk as target on 29 November 1999.

Citations 

Ships built in Lorient
1961 ships
Commandant Rivière-class frigates